Apollo High School is a high school located in Glendale, Arizona.  It is part of the Glendale Union High School District (GUHSD).  It enrolls approximately 2,200 students in grades 9-12. The Apollo High School motto has changed over recent years from "Pride, Class and Dignity" to the current "Choose Excellence".

The nickname is the Hawks, and the school colors are navy blue, gold, and white.

History 
Apollo opened in 1970 designed by local architects Varney, Sexton Sydnor Associates. The design used was similar to Moon Valley High School which opened 5 years earlier. The construction contract to build the school was awarded to TGK Construction Company.

The campus was dedicated on November 13, 1970 by Apollo 13 Astronaut Jack Swigert.

Athletics
Apollo High School is a member of the Arizona Interscholastic Association. AHS offers sports for both boys and girls during the fall, winter, and spring seasons.

 Apollo High School boys' basketball team won the Arizona State 4A Championship three years in a row (2005, 2006, 2007).
 Apollo High School girls' basketball team was the runner-up of the Arizona State Championship in their division in 2010.
 Apollo High School boys' soccer team won the Arizona State 5A Championship in 1993.
 An unrelated organization uses the Apollo football field for its home games, the Arizona Assassins of the Women's Football Alliance.

Awards and recognition
Apollo High School has been granted "Excelling" status by Arizona in accordance with the No Child Left Behind Act and high AIMS scores over the past years.

Apollo High School is ranked 53rd top high school within Arizona.

Demographics
Apollo High School is largely Hispanic (66%), 19% White, 9% Black, and less than 6% of other races. The school also has a large Muslim population, as well as a minor but growing Asian population.

Notable alumni

Prince Amukamara , Super Bowl champion (XLVI), cornerback for the Chicago Bears
Jennie Garth (1986–1988, did not graduate), actress
Bob Horner (Class of 1976), professional baseball infielder (1978–1988)
Rick Kranitz, Major League Baseball pitching coach
Paul Lo Duca (Class of 1990), former Major League Baseball catcher (1998–2008)
Devin Perrin, (class of 1999) drafted by the Montreal Expos in the 7th round of the 2003 MLB Draft from Grand Canyon University (Phoenix, AZ)
Joey Reiman, (class of 1999) drafted by the Toronto Blue Jays in the 16th round of the 2003 from Grand Canyon University (Phoenix, AZ)
J. J. Yeley (Class of 1994), professional stock car racing driver; currently competes full-time in the NASCAR Sprint & Xfinity Series.

References

External links
 Apollo High School web page
 Apollo High School at GUHSD web page

Education in Glendale, Arizona
Educational institutions established in 1970
Schools in Maricopa County, Arizona
Public high schools in Arizona
1970 establishments in Arizona